Wahine, the Hawaiian and Māori word for woman, can mean:

People
Alapaiwahine, Princess of the Island of Hawaii
Kamauliwahine, “queen” (Aliʻi Nui) of Molokai
Keākealaniwahine, a High Chiefess of the Island of Hawaii

Goddess
 Kihe-Wahine, a Polynesian goddess

Government
 Mana Wahine Te Ira Tangata, a New Zealand political party from 1998 to 2001

Sports
 A female surfer
 A member of the University of Hawaiʻi at Mānoa's ladies sports teams, the Hawaii Rainbow Wahine

Vessels
 Wahine (ship), any of several ships named Wahine
 (1913–51), a New Zealand inter-island ferry that also served in World War I and World War II
 , a 1966-built New Zealand inter-island passenger ferry that foundered in Wellington Harbour in 1968

See also
 Vahine no te vi (Woman of the Mango), a painting by Paul Gauguin